Krná is a village and municipality in the Poltár District in the Banská Bystrica Region of Slovakia. In respect to population it belongs to the smallest municipalities in Slovakia. In the village is public library and the dwellings are connected to the public water supply net.

References

External links
 
 
http://www.e-obce.sk/obec/krna/krna.html
http://www.citypopulation.de/php/slovakia-banskobystrickykraj.php?cityid=511501

Villages and municipalities in Poltár District